The 2010s (pronounced ''"twenty-tens"; shortened to "the '10s" also known as "The Tens" or more rarely "The Teens") was a decade that began on January 1, 2010, and ended on December 31, 2019.

The decade began with an optimistic economical recovery from the late 2000s financial crisis. Inflation and interest rates stayed low and steady throughout the decade, Gross world product grew from 2010 to 2019, marking a period of stable recovery. The 2010s were a prosperous decade for the global economy, fueled by strong economic growth in many countries, robust consumer spending, increased investment in infrastructure, and the emergence of new technologies. Unrest in some countries—particularly in the Arab world—evolved into socioeconomic crises triggering revolutions in Tunisia, Egypt, and Bahrain as well as civil wars in Libya, Syria, and Yemen in a regional phenomenon commonly referred to as the Arab Spring, while the resulting European debt crisis was pronounced early in the decade. Shifting social attitudes saw LGBT rights make substantial progress during the decade, particularly in developed countries.

Following the economic recovery, the decade saw a musical and cultural dominance in dance-pop, electronic dance music, hipster culture and electropop. Globalization and an increased demand for variety and personalisation in the face of music streaming services such as Spotify, SoundCloud and Apple Music created many subgenres. As the decade progressed, diversity was also seen with the mainstream success of K-pop, Latin music and trap. Superhero films became box office leaders, with Avengers: Endgame becoming the highest-grossing film of all time. Due to the high quality of many television series throughout this decade, as well as technological breakthroughs that allowed streaming, cable television, and internet outlets to provide this high quality and amount of programming, the 2010s are frequently referred to as the "Golden Age of Television". Cable providers saw a decline in subscriber numbers as cord cutters switched to lower cost online streaming services such as Netflix, Amazon Prime, Hulu and Disney+. The video game industry continued to be dominated by Nintendo, Sony, and Microsoft; while indie games became sustainably more popular, with Minecraft becoming the best-selling game of all time. Handheld console gaming revenue was overtaken by mobile gaming revenue in 2011. The best-selling book of this decade was Fifty Shades of Grey. Drake was named the top music artist of the decade in the US by Billboard.

The United States continued to retain its superpower status while China, along with launching vast economic initiatives and military reforms, sought to expand its influence in the South China Sea and in Africa, solidifying its position as an emerging superpower, despite also causing series of conflicts around its frontiers. Within its border, China also enhanced its suppression and control of Hong Kong, Xinjiang, and Tibet. Global competition between China and the U.S. coalesced into a "containment" effort and a trade war. Elsewhere in Asia, the Koreas improved their relations after a prolonged crisis, and the War on Terror continued as a part of the U.S.'s continued military involvement in many parts of the world. The rise of the Islamic State of Iraq and the Levant extremist organization in 2014 erased the borders between Syria and Iraq, resulting in a multinational intervention. In Africa, South Sudan broke away from Sudan, and mass protests and various coups d'état saw longtime strongmen deposed. In the U.S., celebrity businessman Donald Trump was elected president amid an international wave of populism and neo-nationalism. The European Union experienced a migrant crisis in the middle of the decade and the historic United Kingdom EU membership referendum followed by withdrawal negotiations during its later years. Russia attempted to assert itself in international affairs, annexing Crimea in 2014.

Information technology progressed, with smartphones becoming widespread. The internet grew from covering 28.9% to 54% of the world population, and also saw advancements in wireless networking devices, mobile telephony, and cloud computing. Advancements in data processing and the rollout of 4G broadband allowed data, metadata, and information to be collected and dispersed among domains at paces never before seen while online resources such as social media facilitated phenomena such as the Me Too movement, the rise of slacktivism, and online cancel culture. WikiLeaks gained international attention for publishing classified information on topics including Guantánamo Bay, Syria, the Afghan and Iraq wars, and United States diplomacy. Edward Snowden blew the whistle on global surveillance, raising awareness on the role governments and private entities have in global surveillance and information privacy. Baidu, Twitter and Instagram emerged to become among the top 10 most visited websites, while Wikipedia went from the 9th to the 5th most popular website, almost septupling its monthly visits. Yahoo significantly declined in popularity, descending from being the 1st to the 9th most popular site, with monthly visits declining by two-thirds. Google, Facebook, YouTube and Yandex maintained relatively consistent popularity and remained within the top 10 throughout the decade.

Global warming became increasingly noticeable through new record temperatures in different years and extreme weather events on all continents. The CO2 concentration rose from 390 to 410 PPM over the decade. At the same time, combating pollution and climate change continued to be major concerns, as protests, initiatives, and legislation garnered substantial media attention. Particularly, the Paris Agreement (2015) was adopted, and the global climate youth movement was formed. Major natural disasters included the 2010 Haiti earthquake, the 2011 Tōhoku earthquake and tsunami, the Nepal earthquake of 2015, the 2018 Sulawesi earthquake and tsunami, and the devastating hurricanes Bopha (Pablo), Haiyan (Yolanda), and Maria, as well as the 2019 European heat waves.

During the decade, the world population grew from 6.9 to 7.7 billion people. There were approximately 1.4 billion births during the decade (140 million per year), and about 560 million deaths (56 million per year).

Politics and wars

Major conflicts

The prominent wars of the decade include:

International wars

Civil wars

Revolutions and major protests

Successful revolutions and otherwise major protests of the decade include, but are not limited to:

Arab Spring

The Arab Spring was a series of anti-government protests, uprisings, and armed rebellions that spread across much of the Islamic world in the early 2010s. It began in response to oppressive regimes and a low standard of living, starting with protests in Tunisia. In the news, social media has been heralded as the driving force behind the swift spread of revolution throughout the world, as new protests appear in response to success stories shared from those taking place in other countries. In many countries, the governments have also recognised the importance of social media for organising and have shut down certain sites or blocked Internet service entirely, especially in the times preceding a major rally. Governments have also scrutinised or suppressed discussion in those forums through accusing content creators of unrelated crimes or shutting down communication on specific sites or groups, such as through Facebook.

Nuclear proliferation

On 8 April 2010, the United States and Russia signed a treaty in Prague, Czech Republic agreed to reduce the stockpiles of their nuclear weapons by half. It is meant to replace the Strategic Offensive Reductions Treaty (SORT), which was set to expire. The treaty went into force on 5 February 2011 after it was ratified by both nations.
In 2015, Iran and other world powers agreed to trade sanctions relief for explicit constraints on Iran's contentious nuclear program, including allowing the inspections of nuclear facilities by the International Atomic Energy Agency (IAEA). On 16 January 2016 the IAEA confirmed that Iran had complied with the agreement (the JCPOA), allowing the United Nations to lift sanctions immediately. However, on 8 May 2018, United States President Donald Trump announced the United States was withdrawing from the deal.
On 7 July 2017, the United Nations passed the Treaty on the Prohibition of Nuclear Weapons, the first legally binding international agreement to comprehensively prohibit nuclear weapons, with the goal of leading towards their total elimination. It has been signed by 58 nations.
Throughout the decade, North Korea expanded its nuclear capabilities, performing alleged nuclear tests in 2013 and 2016, which governments responded by placing international sanctions on the country. In response North Korea has threatened the United States, South Korea and Japan with pre-emptive nuclear strikes. However, in 2018, North Korea suggested that they may disarm their nuclear arsenal after negotiations with the United States.
 On 1 February 2019, The US formally suspended the Russo-American Intermediate-Range Nuclear Forces Treaty (INF), and Russia did the same on the following day in response. The US formally withdrew from the treaty on 2 August 2019.
 The United States initiated a renovation of its nuclear weapon arsenal.

Terrorist attacks

The most prominent terrorist attacks committed against civilian populations during the decade include, but are not limited to:

Political trends

International relations

China was increasingly called a superpower in the early 2010s, including at the 2011 meeting between President Hu Jintao and United States President Barack Obama. China overtook the U.S. as the world's largest trading nation, filing the most patents, expanding its military, landing its lunar rover Yutu on the moon (ending a four-decade lack of lunar exploration) and creating China's Oriental Movie Metropolis as a major film and cultural centre. In 2018, global military spending reached the highest it has been since 1988, late Cold War levels, largely fuelled by increased defence spending by China and the United States, whose budgets together accounted for half of the world's total military spending. In 2019, the Lowy Institute Asia Power Index, which measures the projections of power in the Indo-Pacific, called both China and the United States the superpowers of the 21st century, citing immense influence in almost all eight indexes of power.

Along with China, President Vladimir Putin led Russia also steadily increased its defence spending and continued to modernise its military capabilities throughout the decade, including the development of the T-14 Armata main battle tank and the fifth-generation Sukhoi Su-57 jet fighter. Russia also flexed its power projection capabilities, particularly demonstrated during the 2014 annexation of Crimea and its interventions in eastern Ukraine and the Syrian Civil War; Wagner Group had a significant presence in both conflicts. Russia also notably waged information warfare campaigns against its geopolitical foes, including interfering in the 2016 U.S. elections via hacking and leaking emails of U.S. political party leadership and by spreading disinformation via the Internet Research Agency. Other alleged Russian intelligence operations included the Skripal poisonings and the Montenegrin coup plot, both of which were attributed by some to the Unit 29155 organisation. Collectively, these activities—and the Western-led efforts to combat the influence of Russian oligarchs and political interests—have been referred to as the Second Cold War.

The European Union went through several crises. The European debt crisis caused severe economic problems to several eurozone member states, most severely Greece. The 2015 migration crisis led to several million people entering the EU illegally in a short period of time. There was a significant rise in the vote shares of several eurosceptic parties, including the League in Italy, Alternative for Germany, and the Finns Party in Finland. As a result of a referendum, the United Kingdom became the first member state in the EU's history to initiate proceedings for leaving the Union.

Western polarisation
Socio-political polarisation increased as conservatives and social liberals clashed over the role and size of government and other social, economic and environmental issues in the West. In the United States, polls showed a divided electorate regarding healthcare reform, immigration, gun rights, taxation, job creation, and debt reduction. In Europe, movements protesting increasing numbers of refugees and migrants from Islamic countries developed, such as the English Defence League and Pegida.
The trend of polarisation in the West was partially influenced by the prevalence of identity politics, both left-wing and right-wing, among activist movements. Beginning around 2011, far-left and progressive concepts such as combating social inequality and economic inequality, often via progressive stack tactics, proliferated in the Western world and elsewhere. Around the middle of the decade, phenomenon such as white nationalism, identitarianism and emboldened feelings of nativism saw a marked reemergence in the West due to drastically increased migration and corresponding crime and amongst both the right and left general dissatisfaction with Western government and Media responses to certain issues. There were also increased calls for egalitarianism, including between the sexes, and some scholars assert that a fourth wave of feminism began around 2012, with a primary focus on intersectionality.

Antiestablishment politics

Populism in politics saw a widespread surge throughout the decade, with many politicians and various political movements expressing populist sentiments and utilising populist rhetoric. This included conservative wave phenomenon in Latin America and neo-nationalist fervor in Europe and North America. The 2019 European Parliament election saw the highest voter turnout in two decades and saw relatively moderate centre-right and centre-left parties suffer significant losses to less moderate far-right, environmentalist, and both pro-EU and eurosceptic parties, who made gains. Examples of 2010s populist movements included the Tea Party movement, Occupy Wall Street, Brexit, Black Lives Matter, and the alt-right. Examples of populist country leaders were just as extensive, with Donald Trump, Narendra Modi, Andrés Manuel López Obrador, Hugo Chávez, Matteo Salvini, Jair Bolsonaro, Rodrigo Duterte, and Boris Johnson, left and right-wing, described as such.

Related to the rise of populism and protests movements was the decline of traditional political parties. In Europe, pasokification described the loss of vote share experienced by traditional centre-left or social democratic parties. In France, specifically, Emmanuel Macron's La République En Marche! party won a majority in its first election in 2017.

Centre-left, neoliberal and traditional social democratic parties often lost their vote share to more socialist or democratic socialist alternatives, especially in Europe. This happened most completely in Greece, where PASOK was replaced by Syriza as the main left-wing party. Other far-left parties which rose in prominence included Podemos in Spain and La France Insoumise in France. In the two-party systems of the English-speaking world, these challenges mainly came from within the established parties of the left, with Bernie Sanders in the Democratic Party and Jeremy Corbyn in the Labour Party pushing for more left-wing policies.

The political establishment was also challenged in many countries by protest movements, often organised through new social media platforms. These included the various Arab Spring protests, the Occupy movement, and the yellow vests movement.

Democracy and authoritarianism

Countries which democratised fully or partially during the decade included Angola, which reformed under João Lourenço; Armenia, which went through a revolution; Ecuador, which reformed under Lenín Moreno; Ethiopia; and Malaysia, where the ruling party lost the first election since independence.

Long-term dictators ousted from power included Muammar Gaddafi of Libya (after 42 years), Robert Mugabe of Zimbabwe (37 years), Ali Abdullah Saleh of Yemen (33 years), Omar al-Bashir of Sudan (30 years), Hosni Mubarak of Egypt (29 years), and Ben Ali of Tunisia (23 years).

Democratic backsliding occurred in countries such as Hungary, Venezuela, and Turkey.

The Arab Winter refers to the resurgence of authoritarianism, absolute monarchies and Islamic extremism evolving in the aftermath of the Arab Spring protests in Arab countries. The term "Arab Winter" refers to the events across Arab League countries in the Mid-East and North Africa, including the Syrian Civil War, the Iraqi insurgency and the following civil war, the Egyptian Crisis, the Libyan Crisis and the Crisis in Yemen. Events referred to as the Arab Winter include those in Egypt that led to the removal of Mohamed Morsi and the seizure of power by General Abdel Fattah el-Sisi in an anti-Muslim Brotherhood campaign.

In 2018, China's National People's Congress approved a constitutional change that removed term limits for its leaders, granting Xi Jinping the status of "leader for life". Xi is the General Secretary of the Chinese Communist Party (de facto leader).

Deaths
Sitting world leaders such as Hugo Chávez of Venezuela, Muammar Gaddafi of Libya, Kim Jong-il of North Korea, Abdullah of Saudi Arabia, Lech Kaczyński of Poland, Islam Karimov of Uzbekistan and Beji Caid Essebsi of Tunisia, all died in office, as did former leaders Fidel Castro, Lee Kuan Yew, Nelson Mandela, Margaret Thatcher, Robert Mugabe, Giulio Andreotti, Francesco Cossiga, Oscar Luigi Scalfaro, Carlo Azeglio Ciampi, Jacques Chirac, Helmut Schmidt, Helmut Kohl, Mohamed Morsi, Ariel Sharon, Shimon Peres, Akbar Hashemi Rafsanjani, Zine El Abidine Ben Ali, Václav Havel, Malcolm Fraser, Bob Hawke, B. J. Habibie, Yasuhiro Nakasone, Alan García, Jorge Rafael Videla, Néstor Kirchner, Fernando de la Rúa, Patricio Aylwin, Itamar Franco, A. P. J. Abdul Kalam, Atal Bihari Vajpayee and George H. W. Bush.

Prominent political events

Coups

Coups d'état against ruling governments during the decade include:

The following tables of events is listed by the region and by chronological order. The prominent political events include, but are not limited to:

Africa

Americas

Asia

Europe

World leaders
 2010 – 2011 – 2012 – 2013 – 2014 – 2015 – 2016 – 2017 – 2018 – 2019

Assassinations and attempts

Prominent assassinations, targeted killings, and assassination attempts include:

Disasters

Non-natural disasters

Aviation

General

Fires

Marine

Pollution

Natural disasters

Earthquakes and tsunamis

Tropical cyclones

Tornadoes

Floods, avalanches, and mudslides

Volcanic eruptions

Droughts, heat waves, and wildfires

Economics

The global economy during the 2010s was generally strong. It saw steady growth, low unemployment, and increasing consumer confidence. The decade ended with a strong finish, with 2019 seeing record highs in many areas. A sovereign-debt crisis in Europe began in early 2010, and the Greek government admitted that it was having difficulties servicing its large sovereign debt. In the summer and fall of 2011, bond yields for Italy and Spain spiked above 6 percent. By 2015 bond rates had returned to normal ranges across Europe, save for Greece, which accepted another, even more stringent bailout package. The size of the European Financial Stability Facility was increased from €440 billion to €2 trillion. Despite the Eurozone debt crisis, the American Dow Jones Industrial Average had its longest stretch of gains since the late 1990s tech boom. However, economic issues, including inflation and an increase in commodity prices, sparked unrest in many lower-income countries. In some countries, particularly those in the Arab world, political unrest evolved into socioeconomic crises, resulting in the Arab Spring.

As a result of the global recession, many central banks instituted a zero interest-rate policy, or close to it. Another form of monetary stimulus was that of quantitative easing. The resulting flood of market liquidity caused a rise in asset prices. As a result, for example, United States stock prices reached record highs. Another consequence has been the rise in housing prices in many major world cities. Some of the cities which recorded the most dramatic rises included Sydney, San Francisco, Vancouver, and Auckland.

In 2010, China became the second largest global economy, surpassing Japan. Japan also saw a rating downgrade the following year due to debt burden. In August 2011, the S&P downgraded the United States' credit rating from triple AAA to AA-plus following a debt ceiling crisis. Also in 2011, a Gallup poll found that more than half of Americans believed the country was still in a recession. In June 2015, the Shanghai Stock Exchange lost a third of the value of A-shares within one month, an event known as the 2015–16 Chinese stock market turbulence. India became the fastest growing major economy of the world in 2015, surpassing China. In 2018, as the U.S. Federal Reserve raised interest rates, fears of a yield curve inversion preceding a potential U.S. recession sent inflation higher in several emerging markets, including Argentina, where interest rates hit 40% and an International Monetary Fund bail out was issued. In 2019, Singapore supplanted the United States as the world's most competitive economy, with the U.S. dropping to third, behind Hong Kong.

Global oil production in 2014 reached a historic peak, reaching 93 million barrels/day. In 2018, partially due to a shale boom, the United States overcame Russia and Saudi Arabia in becoming the world's largest crude oil producer, the first time since 1973. Around the year 2017 is a period seen by some economists as being the new peak of a "goldilocks economy". The International Monetary Fund's April 2019 World Economic Outlook stated, "After peaking at close to 4 percent in 2017, global [economic] growth remained strong, at 3.8 percent in the first half of 2018, but dropped to 3.2 percent in the second half of the year."

In 2018, United States President Donald Trump announced he would put into place new tariffs on some Chinese products, starting the 'US-China Trade War', an economic conflict involving the world's two largest economies. Trump said the reasoning for the trade war is to punish China for 'unfair' trade practices, such as the appropriation of jobs and the theft of American intellectual property. China responded with tariffs of its own, and a cycle began, escalating the conflict to the situation faced today. As part of his 'America First' policy, Trump also announced new tariffs were being placed on countries around the world for various products such as steel and aluminium, which has drawn some economic retaliation.

By the end of the decade, in North American and some Western European domestic economies, consumer-level purchasing habits had shifted significantly, a partial consequence of the Great Recession's impact on discretionary incomes and a shifting breadwinner model. The so-called "retail apocalypse" had commenced as consumers increasingly resorted to online shopping and e-commerce, accelerating the decline of brick-and-mortar retail and the continued decline of indoor shopping malls. The transitioning retail industry and popularity of online shopping facilitated economic phenomena such as bricks and clicks business models, pop-up and non-store retailing, drone delivery services, ghost restaurants, and a quickly maturing online food ordering and delivery service sector. This was only further perpetuated by the rise in cryptocurrency throughout the decade, such as Bitcoin. By May 2018, over 1,800 cryptocurrency specifications existed.

In the same vein as cryptocurrency, the trend towards a cashless society continued as non-cash transactions and digital currency saw an increase in favourability in the 2010s. By 2016, only about 2 percent of the value transacted in Sweden was by cash, and only about 20 percent of retail transactions were in cash. Fewer than half of bank branches in the country conducted cash transactions. A report published during the final year of the decade suggested that the percentage of payments conducted in cash in the United Kingdom had fallen to 34% from 63% ten years earlier. The 2016 United States User Consumer Survey Study claimed that 75 percent of respondents preferred a credit or debit card as their payment method while only 11 percent of respondents preferred cash.

Science and technology

Two of the most prominent deaths in the scientific community during the decade were Neil Armstrong in 2012 and Stephen Hawking in 2018.

Below are the most significant scientific developments of each year, based on the annual Breakthrough of the Year award of the American Association for the Advancement of Science journal Science.

2010: The first quantum machine
2011: HIV treatment as prevention (HPTN 052)
2012: Discovery of the Higgs boson
2013: Cancer immunotherapy
2014: Rosetta comet mission
2015: CRISPR genome-editing method
2016: The Laser Interferometer Gravitational-Wave Observatory makes the first observation of gravitational waves, fulfilling Einstein's prediction
2017: Cosmic convergence: Neutron star merger (GW170817)
2018: Development cell by cell
2019: First black hole image released

Technology

Robotics, particularly drones like quadcopters, experienced a wide use and application in the 2010s. Autonomous and electric car technology and sales showed considerable growth as well. In addition, sustainable space launch technologies were spearheaded by entrepreneurs like Elon Musk. Video Games began to merge hand in hand with technology as seen in applications like Wii Street U, an app which used Google Street View and the Nintendo Wii U to examine the cities of the world, streets, and addresses on a virtual globe. In 2016, the number of people globally using mobile devices to access the internet overtook those using desktop computers for the first time, having been preceded by the U.S. two years prior in 2014. 3D printers also emerged in the 2010s and were referenced or used in pop culture during the decade. 

In 2018, during the Falcon Heavy test flight, the first production car was launched into space. The car was attached to the Falcon Heavy rocket, the most powerful rocket in operation at the time.

Cyber security and hacking

Cyber security incidents, such as hacking, leaks or theft of sensitive information, gained increased attention of governments, corporations and individuals.

Health and society

AIDS, a pandemic responsible for killing over 30 million people since its discovery in the early 1980s, especially in sub-Saharan Africa, became a treatable condition, though by the end of the decade only two cases had been cured. With good treatment patients can generally expect normal lives and lifespans. However,  only some 5 million of the 12 million affected people had access to such treatment.

During the 2010s, social changes included increases in life expectancy and falling birth rates leading to larger proportions of the population being elderly. This put pressure on pensions and other social security programs in developed nations. The environment became a topic of greater public concern around the world. Many parts of the world moved towards greater acceptance of LGBT people often including the legalisation of same-sex marriage. The internet took an ever greater role in entertainment, communication, politics and commerce, especially for younger people and those living in wealthier countries. In 2011, the world population reached seven billion people.

Popular culture

The most prominent events and trends in popular culture of the decade (particularly in the Anglosphere) include:

Fashion

Fashion of the 2010s became slimmer-fit and slightly more formal compared to previous decades. In addition, people's handheld devices such as cellphones (and their colorful cases), selfie sticks (for a brief period during the middle of the decade), tech-like Beats headphones, smart watches, wired and by the end of the decade wireless ear-buds, as well as handheld gaming systems became more prevalent personal items. The decade was also defined by new hipster fashion (hipster styles were marked by the wearing of knit beanies, checkered shirts, and clothes from thrift stores; as well as hobbies like horticulture, photography, and specialty coffee) athleisure, and a revival of austerity-era and other nostalgic alternative fashion trends (such as 1980s-style neon streetwear and unisex 1990s-style elements influenced by grunge).

In 2018, a subculture of "e-kids" came into existence, whom took their style from Japanese street fashion, cosplay, skater aesthetic, and other pieces of pop culture. In contrast to the colorful subculture of "e-kids" later in the decade, the early 2010s saw the Emo revival.

Political fashion became a genre of fashion starting around 2016, as people wore hats like MAGA hats (popularized by political outsider, prior TV-star and businessman President Donald Trump), as well as the Pussyhat. These two pieces of fashion wear would be popularized in the 2010s in popular culture on television and further, but would become controversial in their own right.

The decade sparked many smaller fashion movements, notable examples including Cottagecore and Normcore (a notable icon of Normcore in the 2010s was Steve Jobs, whom represented the decade's casual clothing). To a lesser extent objects like the Fidget spinner, Silly Bandz, and Shutter shades remained popular among youth throughout the decade.

Internet
The Internet grew from covering 28.9% to 54% of the world population.

Over the course of the 2010s, Baidu, Twitter and Instagram emerged to become among the top 10 most visited websites (becoming the 4th, 6th and 8th most popular websites by the end of the decade), while Wikipedia went the 9th to 5th most popular website, almost septupling its monthly visits (from 1 to 5.7 billion). Meanwhile, Yahoo significantly declined in popularity, descending from being the 1st to 9th most popular site, with monthly visits declining by two-thirds (going from 11.6 to 3.9 billion). Google, Facebook, YouTube and Yandex maintained relatively consistent popularity and remained within the top 10 throughout the decade.

Film

Superhero films became box office leaders, especially with the Marvel Cinematic Universe whose Avengers: Endgame became the  second highest-grossing film of all time, grossing over $2.7 billion worldwide. Horror film It, which was based on the novel of the same name by Stephen King, became the highest-grossing horror film of all time.  Motion capture grew in terms of its realism and reach, and was seen in movies like Steven Spielberg's Ready Player One, a film which was praised for its visual effects. The decade also saw the release of many popular and critically acclaimed films of many genres such as The Social Network, Her, 12 Years a Slave, Boyhood, Me and Earl and the Dying Girl, The Edge of Seventeen, The Fault in Our Stars, The Wolf of Wall Street, The Perks of Being a Wallflower, The Grand Budapest Hotel, Easy A, 21 Jump Street, La La Land, Eighth Grade, Steve Jobs, Lady Bird, Green Book, Moonlight, Get Out, Parasite, Love, Simon, The Irishman, Once Upon a Time in Hollywood, and Uncut Gems.

The critically acclaimed movies of the 2010s mentioned above set new precedents. Movies like Boyhood (2014) were filmed over the span of a decade in real time to show the growth and childhood of a young boy, and Uncut Gems (2019) brought Adam Sandler back to a wide screen release and was critically acclaimed, while teenage movies like The Edge of Seventeen (2016), Me and Earl and the Dying Girl (2015) and The Perks of Being a Wallflower (2012) gained large popularity. Her (2013) became Spike Jonze's highest grossing and most critically acclaimed movie, noted for its filming locations and art direction, Parasite (2019) became the first foreign film to win best picture, and movies like Ready Player One (2018) helped advance motion capture technologies (winning two Outstanding Achievement Awards from the Visuals Effects Society and a Saturn Award for Best Science Fiction Film), in addition to becoming one of Spielberg's highest-grossing films.

2019's Joker became the first R rated movie to gross over $1 billion and cemented itself in popular culture by making the Joker Stairs famous at the end of the decade. In January 2010, James Cameron's Avatar surpassed $1 billion in sales, becoming the first movie of the decade to do so, and surpassed $2 billion in sales by February 2010. The following year, Harry Potter and the Deathly Hallows – Part 2 became one of the fastest grossing films of all time, and became the highest-grossing film of 2011.

Television

The 2010s decade is often said to be a part of the Golden Age of Television, due to the widespread quality of multiple shows, as well as advancements in technology leading to streaming, cable television, and online outlets bringing this quality and quantity of programming.

Cable providers saw a decline in subscriber numbers as cord-cutting viewers switched to lower-cost online streaming services such as Netflix, Amazon Prime, and Hulu. On cable television, as well as streaming services, a variety of shows gained popularity. Newer adult animation grew rapidly throughout the decade with shows such as Rick and Morty (which became a phenomenon among Millennials and Generation Z, the show growing a dedicated fanbase and cult following), F Is for Family, BoJack Horseman, Bob's Burgers, among many others. Nickelodeon brought back three classic Nicktoons; Hey Arnold! (Hey Arnold!: The Jungle Movie), Rocko's Modern Life (Rocko's Modern Life: Static Cling, which was themed around late 2010s culture), and Invader Zim (Invader Zim: Enter the Florpus) near the end of the decade, turning them into reboot films. Cartoon Network also brought back shows such as Mad, The Powerpuff Girls, and Johnny Bravo, while adult animation like Family Guy, Futurama, South Park, The Simpsons, Robot Chicken, and 2011's Beavis and Butt-Head remained popular. Anime broadened it's appeal worldwide with shows such as Attack on Titan, Mob Psycho 100, Sailor Moon Crystal, One Punch Man, My Hero Academia, and JoJo's Bizzarre Adventure, as well Japanese reality shows like Terrace House: Boys & Girls in the City reached new and international audiences. Adventure Time, The Loud House (which featured one boy and ten sisters and later turned into a live-action series), Regular Show, Steven Universe, Phineas and Ferb, Gravity Falls, The Amazing World of Gumball, My Little Pony: Friendship Is Magic (which, under its G4 status, became a pop culture phenomenon in its own right, thanks to its controversial, but loyal cult following known as 'Bronies' who peaked in 2012–2015), Arthur, SpongeBob SquarePants were among other cartoons that were popular during the decade. SpongeBob SquarePants also made headlines for the petition and attempts to get "Sweet Victory" played at the 2019 Super Bowl after the passing of its series creator Stephen Hillenburg. The comedy sitcom The Big Bang Theory ran for the entirety of the decade, and was the number-one television sitcom for all of its airing prior to its finale in 2019. Other sitcoms like Curb Your Enthusiasm, Will & Grace, The Office, Scrubs: Med School, Netflix's Trailer Park Boys and its Out Of The Park: USA and Europe specials and How I Met Your Mother narrated by Bob Saget (HIMYM of which gained controversy for its 2014 finale, "Last Forever", which sparked an alternate finale to be created for the show, a television-first) were popular in the 2010s. Cult shows like the dark comedy It's Always Sunny in Philadelphia carried its popularity from the 2000s and lasted through the entirety of the 2010s. CBS's Two Broke Girls began its run in 2011 (ending in 2017), its pilot being the highest watched on the network in a decade. In 2011, Charlie Sheen was fired from Two and a Half Men, who made his last appearance in the show in Season 8 during February 2011. Sheen's 2011 outbursts and firing from the show were highly publicized. The Apprentice was a reality television show that starred media personality and businessman Donald Trump as host until 2015, at which time resigning as host Trump would use the success he gained on The Apprentice to run for President of the United States; which he was elected to in 2016. Additionally, programs such as The Celebrity Apprentice, Comedy Central's The Roast Of Donald Trump, and Donald Trump's November 2015 hosting of Saturday Night Live, would send the reality TV star and businessman into the spotlight to help win the U.S. presidency. Governor in the early 2010s and movie star Arnold Schwarzenegger took Trump's place on The Celebrity Apprentice. Indian sitcom Taarak Mehta Ka Ooltah Chashmah became the world's longest-running sitcom, with over 2,500 episodes, and dramas like Breaking Bad (2008–2013), The Walking Dead (2010–2022), Game of Thrones (2011–2019) and the Breaking Bad spin-off Better Call Saul (2015–2022) became some of the most popular American television series of all time.

A new era of family television and tween television existed in the 2010s, sitcoms of which were mainly spearheaded by Disney and Nickelodeon, but also appeared on cable channels such as ABC (The Middle and The Goldbergs for example) and on streaming services like Netflix. Shows such as Nickelodeon's iCarly and Victorious, and Disney's Girl Meets World were notable examples of popular shows among tween and youth throughout the 2010s. Stranger Things gained a massive following during the decade among teen and youth, and 2019's Stranger Things 3 gained even more recognition for the character of Robin Buckley, who was popularized online. The short-lived 2018 version of Roseanne (a family sitcom on ABC) gained attention for the firing of its main star Roseanne Barr and her outbursts. 

Reality television grew an increased following during the decade. Kitchen Nightmares and Hotel Hell gained popularity on cable television, as well as getting millions of views on YouTube, making Gordon Ramsay famous. America's Got Talent drew in viewers when radio personality Howard Stern announced his joining of the show in late 2011, staying as host until 2015. Meanwhile, popular reality programming on ABC included What Would You Do?, Shark Tank and The Bachelor. Corinne Olympios also gained recognition on the 2017 season of The Bachelor for her behavior on set. American Idol remained popular into the beginning of the decade, as did The Voice. Impractical Jokers flourished throughout the 2010s, gaining exposure on YouTube and elsewhere. TMZ became a popular television show and news source in the 2010s on cable television and YouTube respectively. A genre of pawn shows emerged like Pawn Stars and Hardcore Pawn. 

Science fiction television gained a renewed sense of interest, thanks in part to Seth MacFarlane's The Orville and its second season which aired on Fox between 2017 and 2019, inspired by and parading the Star Trek franchise. Black Mirror and Westworld also gained a large following, and science nonfiction such as Cosmos: A Spacetime Odyssey joined the lineup on Fox.

YouTube
The video streaming website YouTube became popular, especially among younger people, as memes shifted the meaning of entertainment. Memes like Nyan Cat, Dat Boi, "We Are Number One", Trollface, Pepe the Frog, Bottle flipping, Bernie Sanders' Dank Meme Stash, Condescending Wonka, Creepypastas and others emerged on YouTube; the use of YouTube and the internet also lead to new and popular vernacular like: poggers, bae, Netflix and chill, and "on fleek". Channels like Fred Figglehorn (FRED), The Annoying Orange, Smosh, PewDiePie and Angry Video Game Nerd attracted millions of views, channels and videos becoming viral on the site. The popularity of YouTubers even ended up spawning films based on popular YouTubers, including Angry Video Game Nerd: The Movie (2014), Smosh: The Movie (2015), and the Fred Trilogy (2010–2012) starting with Fred: The Movie. These YouTubers became well known through comedic skits, video game reviews, and "Let's Play" videos, as Angry Video Game Nerd reviewed games like Sonic The Hedgehog for the Xbox 360, and Life of Black Tiger for the PlayStation 4, which AVGN reviewed in a video featuring Gilbert Gottfried, Smosh would upload skits like "FOOD BATTLE" and Pewdiepie would play games such as Five Nights at Freddy's.

Other YouTubers that constantly received views within the millions or went viral during the decade included the likes of bill wurtz for his "history of japan" and "history of the entire world i guess" videos (and music like "and the day goes on"), Swoozie, Etika (and his fanbase the "JOYCONBOYZ"), h3h3Productions, Fine Brothers Entertainment, Domics, The Joe Rogan Experience, Nardwuar, The Nostalgia Critic, Scott the Woz, 
and TheOdd1sOut, among many others. YouTube itself would even end up banning controversial content creators like LeafyIsHere during the decade.

Music

Globalism and an increased demand for variety and personalisation in the face of music streaming services such as Spotify and Apple Music created many new subgenres. US digital music sales topped CD sales in 2012. Dance, hip-hop, and pop music surged in the 2010s, with hip-hop and R&B surpassing rock as the biggest US music genre in 2018. At the beginning of the decade in 2010, musicians like Lady Gaga, Justin Bieber, Katy Perry, Bruno Mars, Taylor Swift, Rihanna and Nicki Minaj (with their successful albums The Fame Monster, My World 2.0, Teenage Dream, Doo-Wops & Hooligans, Speak Now, Loud and Pink Friday respectively) increased the global commercial appeal of pop music, with each of them selling over 100 million records in the 2010s and becoming some of the best-selling musicians of all time. Electronic dance music (EDM) achieved mass commercial success in the middle of the decade but fell somewhat into decline by the end. The mass global appeal of EDM music (and subgenres such as dubstep, electro house and trap) from the early-to-mid part of the decade spawned the rise in fame of DJs and digital music producers, such as Skrillex, Tiësto, Avicii, Steve Aoki, Deadmau5, Calvin Harris, Baauer and Diplo. Country music also saw a resurgence throughout the 2010s in the United States, with artists like Luke Bryan, Jason Aldean, Blake Shelton, Carrie Underwood, Eric Church, Kacey Musgraves, Chris Stapleton and Florida Georgia Line topping the charts and garnering many music industry awards. With the rise of the internet in the 2010s, independent music (or "indie music") gained a large international cult following, with successful indie bands being Foster the People, Dr. Dog, Tally Hall, Florence and The Machine, Beach House, alt-J, Of Monsters and Men, The National, Two Door Cinema Club, and M83; as well as successful indie solo artists being Tame Impala, Neil Cicierega, St. Vincent, Father John Misty, Ellie Goulding, Feist, Sufjan Stevens, Lana Del Rey, Justin Vernon and Lorde.

Billboard named Drake the top artist of the decade in the US. Other popular musical solo artists of the 2010s included Adele, Ed Sheeran, Beyoncé, Kanye West, Kendrick Lamar, J. Cole, The Weeknd, Frank Ocean, Ariana Grande, Miley Cyrus, Khalid, Sam Smith, Travis Scott, Cardi B, Future, Shawn Mendes, Post Malone, Kesha, Selena Gomez and Fetty Wap.  Popular musical groups of the decade included One Direction, BTS, Imagine Dragons, Mumford & Sons, Arcade Fire, Twenty One Pilots, Migos, Swedish House Mafia, Bon Iver, Zac Brown Band, Maroon 5, Alabama Shakes, The Chainsmokers, OneRepublic, Vampire Weekend, The Lumineers, Lady A and Fun. Successful duos included The Black Keys, Run the Jewels, Matt and Kim, Rae Sremmurd, Love and Theft, LMFAO, Garfunkel and Oates and Dan + Shay.

Several prominent musicians from past decades died in the 2010s, including Ronnie James Dio in 2010, Gil Scott-Heron and Amy Winehouse in 2011, Whitney Houston and Adam Yauch in 2012, Lou Reed in 2013, Joe Cocker in 2014, Ben E. King, B.B. King and Lemmy Kilmister in 2015, David Bowie, Glenn Frey, Phife Dawg, Merle Haggard, Prince, Leonard Cohen and George Michael all in 2016, Chuck Berry, Chris Cornell, Prodigy and Tom Petty in 2017, Aretha Franklin in 2018, and Keith Flint in 2019. There were also several deaths of newer hip hop artists who had started or first became successful in the 2010s, including Capital Steez, Lil Peep, XXXTentacion, Mac Miller, Nipsey Hussle, Juice WRLD and others.

Video games

The video game industry continued to be dominated by Nintendo, Sony, and Microsoft; Minecraft became the best-selling game of all time in 2019. Handheld console gaming revenue was overtaken by mobile gaming revenue in 2011, due to the rise of smartphones. The popularity of video games increased across the world, as the Wii influenced gaming in the early part of the decade, and the Nintendo 3DS provided 3D gaming through autostereoscopy. The successful Nintendo Wii was followed by the Wii U in 2012, a commercial failure. The Nintendo Wii would be responsible for the most critically acclaimed game of the 2010s decade, Super Mario Galaxy 2 (which is also often considered one of the greatest video games of all time by game critics). The Wii (and later to a lesser extent the Wii U) would singlehandedly cause the increased use of motion controls in gaming with its Wii line up of games such as Wii Play: Motion, Wii Fit U, Wii Sports Club, Wii Party and Wii Party U, all released in the 2010s. Motion controls would carry over and advance during the decade with the Nintendo Switch's Joy-Con in 2017, and would form the foundation of 2010's motion-based PlayStation Move and Xbox Kinect, counterparts and competitors to the Wii. The PlayStation 4 and Xbox One released in 2013, and in the United States the PlayStation 4 became the highest-selling console of the decade. The Nintendo Switch launched in 2017 and was responsible for bringing Nintendo's success back, the success of the console initially spawned by the strong sales of both The Legend of Zelda: Breath of the Wild and Super Mario Odyssey, as well as titles like ARMS, 1-2-Switch, Super Smash Bros Ultimate, Yoshi's Crafted World, as well as re-releases/sequels of Super Mario Maker, Splatoon , Mario Kart 8, New Super Mario Bros. U, among many others. Ports and sequels to Wii U games on the Nintendo Switch sold considerably better than their Wii U counterparts, and even though well-received games like Super Mario 3D World and Nintendo Land released on Wii U, the console still ultimately failed due to poor marketing and public confusion.  YouTube became a platform for "Let's Players" to upload videos of themselves playing certain games, which led to the popularity of existing games and newer indie games like Cuphead, Undertale, Octodad/Octodad: Dadliest Catch, and Five Nights At Freddy's (indie games like Cuphead were lauded for its rubber hose animation style, while Undertale's soundtrack like "Megalovania" came to light). "Let's Players" were even referenced in greater pop culture such as the 2014 episode Rehash on South Park where gamer Pewdiepie appeared. The use of iPods, tablets, and cell phones became one of the most popular forms of gaming as the decade progressed with the rise of mobile games, expanding the industry's appeal among less traditional markets such as women and older adults. Apps in the form of games such as Pac-Man 256, Flappy Bird, Angry Birds, Pokémon Go, Subway Surfers, Doodle Jump, Cut the Rope, Smash Hit, Miitomo, and Candy Crush Saga became hits. (In addition to Super Mario Galaxy 2, it is notable in mentioning that Nintendo Wii released a large group of critically acclaimed games in the early 2010s with popular titles such as Kirby's Epic Yarn, Donkey Kong Country Returns, The Legend of Zelda: Skyward Sword, Epic Mickey, and Sonic Colors, as well Portal 2 on Xbox and PlayStation).

The 2010s marked the growth, release, and large expansion of the "Toys To Life" category. Brands such as Nintendo's Amiibo became massively popular, and allowed figurines to be bought which were scanned into games to level up, train your figurine, or receive goods for your figurine. The Amiibo skyrocketed in success due to the roster of figurines available for Super Smash Bros. for Nintendo 3DS and Wii U, with many posting videos of them online going "amiibo hunting" mostly around late 2014 and 2015. Skylanders and Disney Infinity also remained popular at the time, as fads. The Nintendo Labo released in 2018, was also a part of the "Toys To Life" brand of video games, using cardboard to create objects such as a fishing pole, a crank, and a race-car wheel to be played with games. Micro-consoles also emerged during the decade, a notable example being the Ouya, a system which was a commercial and critical failure that received attention online.

In the 2010s movies based on video game franchises became popular, grossing more and being talked about in the media and among fans more than ever before. Movies like Ryan Reynold's Detective Pikachu (which starred additional actors like Kathryn Newton as Lucy Stevens and Bill Nighy as Howard Clifford) broke box office records for movies based on game series at the time, while movies like actor Jim Carrey's Sonic The Hedgehog created buzz in the media and on shows like Conan (where the film and its fans were satirized) in 2019 for the movie's depiction of a more realistic looking hedgehog character, which by demand of the fans, was changed into a more cartoon version of the titular character to much like and approval upon the November 2019 trailer and movie's release. Video game themed movies became popular as well, with films such as Ready Player One, Pixels, Scott Pilgrim vs. the World, and Wreck-It Ralph. In early 2018 Nintendo and Illumination jointly announced (after the reveal of Nintendo's Universal theme parks) that they were working on a Super Mario Bros. movie. The announcement by Nintendo and Illumination was met with internet speculation. 

The best-selling games of every year throughout this decade were as follows:

 2010: Call of Duty: Black Ops
 2011: Call of Duty: Modern Warfare 3
 2012: Call of Duty: Black Ops II
 2013: Grand Theft Auto V
 2014: Call of Duty: Advanced Warfare
 2015: Call of Duty: Black Ops III
 2016: Call of Duty: Infinite Warfare
 2017: Call of Duty: WWII
 2018: Red Dead Redemption 2
 2019: Call of Duty: Modern Warfare

Literature

The best-selling book of the decade was Fifty Shades of Grey, having sold 15.2 million copies in the United States.

The following is a list of the 10 best-selling books of the decade. Note that global data is unavailable and this is limited to the United States:

 Fifty Shades of Grey – 15.2 million sales
 Fifty Shades Darker – 10.4 million sales
 Fifty Shades Freed – 9.3 million sales
 The Hunger Games – 8.7 million sales
 The Help – 8.7 million sales
 The Girl on The Train – 8.2 million sales
 Gone Girl – 8.1 million sales
 The Fault in Our Stars – 8 million sales
 The Girl with the Dragon Tattoo – 7.9 million sales
 Divergent – 6.6 million sales

The Diary of a Wimpy Kid series also became one of the best-selling book series of all time throughout the 2010s, with installments such as Cabin Fever and The Long Haul winning awards at the Nickelodeon Kids' Choice Awards.

Sports

Popular athletes of the decade included Cristiano Ronaldo, Lionel Messi, Megan Rapinoe, LeBron James, Tiger Woods, Tom Brady, Floyd Mayweather, Manny Pacquiao, Canelo Álvarez, Serena Williams, Novak Djokovic, Kyle Busch, Conor McGregor, Ronda Rousey, Mike Trout, Michael Phelps, Usain Bolt, Shaun White, Kelly Slater, Simone Biles, Sidney Crosby and many more.

At the 2010 Wimbledon Championships, tennis players John Isner and Nicolas Mahut competed in the longest professional tennis match in history, requiring five sets and 183 games for Isner to ultimately defeat Mahut in a match which lasted 11 hours and 5 minutes, and was played over the course of three days.

A doping scandal and investigation that was concluded in 2012 led to former professional road racing cyclist Lance Armstrong being stripped of all seven of his Tour de France titles.

On 14 October 2012, skydiver Felix Baumgartner completed a jump from the stratosphere and set world records for the highest skydive (39 km or 24 mi), fastest freefall speed (1,357.64 km/h or 843.6 mph, or Mach 1.25), and became the first person in history to break the sound barrier without vehicular power.

In 2015, after Thoroughbred racehorse American Pharoah won the American Triple Crown and the Breeders' Cup Classic, he became 12th Triple Crown winner in history and the first in more than 30 years, and in winning all four races, became the first horse ever to win the Grand Slam of Thoroughbred racing.

In November 2016, the Chicago Cubs won the World Series for the first time since 1908, over the then-Cleveland Indians. Their win, along with Game 7 and the entire 2016 Series, was heavily noted in the sports and baseball community. It is often considered one of the best World Series ever played, due to the underdog nature of both teams, how close the games were and especially the final game, and how it ultimately ended the over 100-year drought of the Cubs not winning a series.

In June 2017, rock climber Alex Honnold became the first person in history to free solo climb El Capitan in Yosemite National Park, an accomplishment that one commentator described as "one of the great athletic feats of any kind, ever."

In January 2018, the final play of an NFL playoffs game between the Minnesota Vikings and the New Orleans Saints, dubbed the "Minneapolis Miracle", became the first time in NFL playoffs history where a game ended in a touchdown as time expired, and prompted a change to the NFL's rules as they pertain to extra-point conversion attempts.

Analysis
As the decade drew to a close, some commentators looked back on it as a politically unstable period. An article in the New York Times stated: "With the rise of nationalist movements and a backlash against globalisation on both sides of the Atlantic, the liberal post-World War II order – based on economic integration and international institutions – began to unravel." It heavily discussed the US presidency of Donald Trump (a reality TV Star and businessman with no political experience at the time of taking office, succeeding Barack Obama) whilst also commenting, "Echoes of Mr. Trump's nationalist populism can be found in Prime Minister Boris Johnson of Britain's recent electoral victory and the Brexit referendum of 2016, and in the ascent of the far-right President Jair Bolsonaro of Brazil and Prime Minister Narendra Modi of India. Democracy is under threat in Hungary and Poland. Once fringe right-wing parties with openly racist agendas are rebranding themselves in Sweden and Belgium. And far-right groups in Germany and Spain are now the third-largest parties in those nations' parliaments." A December 2019 piece in The Guardian argued that the 2010s would be remembered "as a time of crises", elaborating "there have been crises of democracy and the economy; of the climate and poverty; of international relations and national identity; of privacy and technology". The article also noted that, in Britain, "politics since 2010 has often been manic. Parties have hastily changed their leaders and policies; sometimes their entire guiding philosophies. Last week's general election was the fourth of the decade; the 1980s, 1990s and 2000s had two apiece." Similar trends of political unrest were felt beyond the Western world, as suggested in The Asian Review, which described the 2010s as a "tumultuous time for Asia, sometimes tragic, sometimes triumphant and never dull".

See also

List of decades

Timeline
The following articles contain brief timelines which list the most prominent events of the decade:

2010s

Notes

References

Further reading
 Strong, Jason. The 2010s: Looking Back at a Dramatic decade (2019)

External links
 

 
21st century
Contemporary history
2010s decade overviews